Mala Plana may refer to two places in Serbia:

Mala Plana near Prokuplje;
Mala Plana near Smederevska Palanka.